The 2015 FIVB Volleyball Men's U21 World Championship was the eighteenth edition of the FIVB Volleyball Men's U21 World Championship, which was hosted by Mexico from 11 to 20 September 2015 in the cities of Mexicali and Tijuana.

Russia, won the tournament after defeating Argentina 3-2 in the final match, thus securing the country's tenth title and the third in a row, after winning the editions of 2011 in Brazil and 2013 in Turkey. Pavel Pankov was elected the Most Valuable Player.

Qualification
The FIVB Sports Events Council confirmed a proposal to streamline the number of teams participating in the Age Group World Championships on 14 December 2013.

Pools composition
Teams were seeded in the first two positions of each pool following the Serpentine system according to their FIVB U21 World Ranking as of December 2014. FIVB reserved the right to seed the hosts as head of Pool A regardless of the U21 World Ranking. All teams not seeded were drawn to take other available positions in the remaining lines, following the U21 World Ranking. The draw was held in Tijuana, Mexico on 25 June 2015. Rankings are shown in brackets except the Hosts who ranked 22nd.

Squads

Venues

Pool standing procedure
 Number of matches won
 Match points
 Sets ratio
 Points ratio
 Result of the last match between the tied teams

Match won 3–0 or 3–1: 3 match points for the winner, 0 match points for the loser
Match won 3–2: 2 match points for the winner, 1 match point for the loser

First round
All times are Pacific Daylight Time (UTC−07:00).

Pool A

|}

|}

Pool B

|}

|}

Pool C

|}

|}

Pool D

|}

|}

Second round
All times are Pacific Daylight Time (UTC−07:00).

Pool E

|}

|}

Pool F

|}

|}

Pool G

|}

|}

Pool H

|}

|}

Final round
All times are Pacific Daylight Time (UTC−07:00).

Classification 13th–16th

13th–16th semifinals

|}

15th place match

|}

13th place match

|}

Classification 9th–12th

9th–12th semifinals

|}

11th place match

|}

9th place match

|}

Classification 5th–8th

5th–8th semifinals

|}

7th place match

|}

5th place match

|}

Final four

Semifinals

|}

3rd place match

|}

Final

|}

Final standing

Awards

Most Valuable Player

Best Setter

Best Outside Spikers

Best Middle Blockers

Best Opposite Spiker

Best Libero

See also
2015 FIVB Volleyball Women's U20 World Championship

References

External links
Official website
Final Standing
Statistics

FIVB Volleyball Men's U21 World Championship
FIVB Men's U21 World Championship
FIVB Men's Junior World Championship
International volleyball competitions hosted by Mexico